Barry Island is in Wales.

Barry Island may also refer to:

Barry Island (Debenham Islands), Antarctica
Barry Island (holiday camp), Wales

See also
Barry Islands, Canadian Arctic Archipelago